Milesi is an Italian surname. Notable people with the surname include:

Marco Milesi, Italian racing cyclist
Piero Milesi (1953–2011), Italian musician
Davide Milesi, Italian runner
Alessandro Milesi (painter) (1856–1945), Italian painter
Alessandro Milesi (footballer) (born 1999), Peruvian footballer
Giuseppe Milesi Pironi Ferretti (1817–1873), Italian Catholic cardinal

Italian-language surnames